Quercus alnifolia, commonly known as the golden oak, is an evergreen oak species of Cyprus. Its common English name refers to the golden coloured lower surface of its leaves. Quercus alnifolia belongs to the endemic flora of the island and it is confined to the igneous geological complex of the Troodos Mountains. In February 2006, the parliament of Cyprus selected the golden oak to be the country's national tree.

Description 

Due to its short stature (in relation to other oaks) it is sometimes referred to as the dwarf oak.

The flowers are unisexual; the male catkins are greenish-yellow forming spreading or pendulous clusters at the tips of the branches; the female flowers are axillary, solitary or in groups of 2–3. The acorns are narrowly obovate or subcylindrical, usually tapering towards the base, 2–2.5 cm long and 0.8–1.2 cm wide, with a woody endocarp and cupule with strongly recurved scales.

Taxonomy

Quercus alnifolia belongs to subgenus Cerris, section Ilex, as with much of the mediterranean evergreen oak species. Occasional hybridization with kermes oak (Quercus coccifera) has been described.

Distribution and habitat 

It occupies dry habitats in association with Pinus brutia or forms dense maquis in mesic habitats, characterized by deep forest soils.

Ecology 

Golden oak offers soil stabilisation against erosion due to its ability to colonize stony and rocky slopes. In its distribution area, Q. alnifolia is the most important broadleaved species forming pure or mixed stands, within the conifer (Pinus brutia, Pinus nigra) dominated forests of Cyprus. Thick stands of Q. alnifolia in mesic habitats, considerably modify the humidity conditions of the site and form forest soils with "mull" humus favouring the existence of sciophilous herbal species.

Like other members of the oak genus, Q. alnifolia forms mutually beneficial, ectomycorrhizal associations with various fungi. A preliminary study in 2011, reported over 80 mycorrhizal fungi to be associated with the golden oak; the total number, however, is estimated to be much higher.

Conservation 
Golden oak is protected by the forest law of Cyprus, while the habitat type "Scrub and low forest vegetation of Quercus alnifolia (9390)" is a priority habitat of Europe (directive 92/43/EEC). Large forest expanses of the species have been proposed for inclusion in the Natura 2000 ecological network of the European Union.

References 

alnifolia
Cyprus Mediterranean forests
Endemic flora of Cyprus
Plants described in 1842
Trees of Mediterranean climate